The 1972 U.S. National Indoor Tennis Championships was a men's tennis tournament held at the Wicomico Youth and Civic Center in Salisbury, Maryland in the United States. The event was part of the 1972 USLTA Indoor Circuit and was also a Grade B event on the 1972 Grand Prix Circuit. It was the second edition of the tournament and was held from February 13 through February 20, 1972, and played on indoor hard courts. First-seeded national Stan Smith won the singles title and $9,000 first-prize money as well as 50 Grand Prix ranking points. It was his second singles title at the event after 1969.

Finals

Singles
 Stan Smith defeated  Ilie Năstase 5–7, 6–2, 6–3, 6–4
 It was Smith' 1st singles title of the year and the 37th of his career.

Doubles
 Andrés Gimeno /  Manuel Orantes defeated  Juan Gisbert Sr. /  Vladimír Zedník 6–4, 6–3

See also
 1972 National Indoor Championships
 1972 U.S. Professional Indoor

References

External links
 ITF tournament edition details

Tennis tournaments in the United States
Salisbury, Maryland
U.S. National Indoor Tennis Championships
U.S. National Indoor Tennis Championships
U.S. National Indoor Tennis Championships